The Thomas Reburn Polygonal Barn is an historic building located near New Albin in rural Allamakee County, Iowa, United States. It was built in 1914 as a beef cattle barn. The building measures  in diameter. It is a 12-sided structure that features red vertical siding and a silo that extends one story through the roof. It is one of four known barns in the round barn genre that was built with a flat or near flat roof in Iowa. It has been listed on the National Register of Historic Places since 1986.

References

Barns on the National Register of Historic Places in Iowa
Buildings and structures completed in 1914
Buildings and structures in Allamakee County, Iowa
Polygonal barns in the United States
National Register of Historic Places in Allamakee County, Iowa